Keyvan Poshteh (also Romanized as Keyvān Poshteh) is a village in Reza Mahalleh Rural District, in the Central District of Rudsar County, Gilan Province, Iran. At the 2006 census, its population was 327, in 110 families.

References 

Populated places in Rudsar County